Mycosphaerella platanifolia is a fungal plant pathogen. During early spring, Mycosphaerella spores are produced in the fruiting bodies of infected leaves. It appears as uneven, round tan spots with red and brown haloes that are approximately 0.1 to 1cm large. Infections of Mycosphaerella are of minor consequence to a tree's health, but may be treated with organic pesticides in the case of a severe outbreak.

See also
 List of Mycosphaerella species

References

Fungal plant pathogens and diseases
platanifolia
Fungi described in 1938